Delta Kappa Delta (Also known as B.E.T.I.S., and DKD) is a United States-based college sorority. Delta Kappa Delta is a cultural interest sorority oriented towards South Asian culture. It was founded at Texas A&M University in 1999. It is a founding member of the National APIDA Panhellenic Association.

History
The precursor to Delta Kappa Delta was a grassroots service organization named B.E.T.I.S. or Behind Every True Indian Sister. Its founders felt the need for a community service-oriented organization. The sorority was formed  at Texas A&M University. Its thirteen founders are:The sorority's philanthropy is child abuse prevention and awareness. In 2014, it was one of the fourteen founding members of the National Asian Pacific Islander American Panhellenic Association (NAPA).

Symbols 
The sorority's symbol is the Diya and its flower is the lotus. Its mascot is the peacock. Its colors are black, silver, and violet. Its motto is “I slept and dreamt that life was joy, I awoke and saw that life was service, I acted, and behold, service was joy.”

Charters 
Following are the 'charters' or chapters of Delta Kappa Delta. Active chapters are indicated in bold. Inactive chapters are indicated in italic.

References 

Asian-American culture in Texas
Fraternities and sororities in the United States
Asian-American fraternities and sororities
Indian-American culture in Texas
1999 establishments in Texas
Student organizations established in 1999
South Asian American culture